Urea-formaldehyde (UF), also known as urea-methanal, so named for its common synthesis pathway and overall structure, is a nontransparent thermosetting resin or polymer.  It is produced from urea and formaldehyde. These resins are used in adhesives, plywood, particle board, medium-density fibreboard (MDF), and molded objects. In agriculture, urea-formaldehyde compounds are one of the most commonly used types of slow-release fertilizer. 

UF and relate amino resins are a class of thermosetting resins of which urea-formaldehyde resins make up 80% produced worldwide. Examples of amino resins use include in automobile tires to improve the bonding of rubber to in paper for improving tear strength, in molding electrical devices, jar caps, etc.

History

UF was first synthesized in 1884 by Dr Hölzer, who was working with Bernhard Tollens, neither of whom realized that the urea and formaldehyde were polymerizing.

In the following years a large number of authors worked on the structure of these resins.

In 1896, Carl Goldschmidt investigated the reaction further. He also obtained an amorphous, almost insoluble precipitate, but he did not realize that polymerization was occurring; he thought that two molecules of urea were combining with three molecules of formaldehyde. In 1897 Carl Goldschmidt patented the use of UF-resins as a disinfectant. General commercialisation followed this and in the following decades, more and more applications were described in the literature.

In 1919, Hanns John (1891–1942) of Prague, Czechoslovakia, obtained the first patent for UF resin in Austria.

Urea-formaldehyde was object matter of judgment via the European Court of Justice (now CJEU) of 5 February 1963, Case 26–62 Van Gend & Loos v Netherlands Inland Revenue Administration.

Properties
It has a refractive index of 1.55.

Chemical structure
The chemical structure of UF polymer consists of [(O)CNHCH2NH]n repeat units. In contrast, melamine-formaldehyde resins feature NCH2OCH2N repeat units. Depending on the polymerization conditions, some branching can occur.  Early stages in the reaction of formaldehyde and urea produce bis(hydroxymethyl)urea.

Production
About 20 million metric tons of UF are produced annually. Over 70% of this production is then put into use by the forest-products industry for bonding particleboard, MDF, hardwood plywood, and laminating adhesive.

General uses

Urea-formaldehyde is pervasive. Examples include decorative laminates, textiles, paper, foundry sand molds, wrinkle-resistant fabrics, cotton blends, rayon, corduroy, etc. It is also used as wood glue. UF was commonly used when producing electrical appliances casing (e.g. desk lamps). Foams have been used as artificial snow in movies.

Agricultural use
Urea-formaldehyde compounds are a widely used as slow-release sources of nitrogen in agriculture. The rate of decomposition into  and  depends on the length of the urea-formaldehyde chains and it relies on the action of microbes found naturally in most soils. The activity of these microbes, and the rate of ammonia release, is temperature-dependent.

Foam insulation

Urea-formaldehyde foam insulation (UFFI) commercialisation dates to the 1930s as a synthetic insulation with R-values up to 5.0 °F⋅ft2⋅h/BTU (0.8 K⋅m2/W). UFFI is a foam with similar consistency to shaving cream, that is easily injected or pumped into voids. It is normally made on site using a pump set and hose with a mixing gun to mix the foaming agent, resin, and compressed air. The fully expanded foam is pumped into areas in need of insulation. It becomes firm within minutes, but cures within a week. UFFI is generally found in homes built or retrofitted from the 1930s to the 1970s, often in basements, wall cavities, crawl spaces and attics. Visually, it looks like oozing liquid that has been hardened. Over time, it tends to vary in shades of butterscotch, but new UFFI is a light yellow colour. Early forms of UFFI tended to shrink significantly. Modern UF insulation with updated catalysts and foaming technology have reduced shrinkage to minimal levels (between 2 and 4%).  The foam dries with a dull matte colour with no shine. When cured, it often has a dry and crumbly texture.

Health concerns
Health effects occur when UF-based materials and products release formaldehyde into the air. Generally, no health effects from formaldehyde are seen when air concentrations are below 1.0 ppm. The onset of respiratory irritation and other health effects, and even increased cancer risk, begin when air concentrations exceed 3.0–5.0 ppm. This triggers watery eyes, nose irritations, wheezing and coughing, fatigue, skin rash, severe allergic reactions, burning sensations in the eyes and throat, nausea, and difficulty in breathing in some humans (usually > 1.0 ppm). Occupants of UFFI-insulated homes with elevated formaldehyde levels experienced systemic symptoms such as headache, malaise, insomnia, anorexia, and loss of libido. Irritation of the mucous membranes (specifically the eyes, nose, and throat) was a common upper respiratory tract symptom related to formaldehyde exposure. However, when compared to control groups, the frequency of symptoms did not exceed the controls except for wheezing, difficult breathing, and a burning skin sensation. Controlled studies have suggested that tolerance to formaldehyde's odor and irritating effects can occur over a prolonged exposure.

See also
 
 Phenol formaldehyde resin

References

External links
 Urea formaldehyde (Plastics Historical Society)
 History of urea-formaldehyde:  Chapter 1 of:  Carl Meyer, Urea-Formaldehyde Resins (Reading, Massachusetts:  Addison-Wesley, 1979)
 Urea-Formaldehyde Foam Insulation(Canada Mortgage and Housing Corporation)
 Indoor Air Quality: Formaldehyde(US Environmental Protection Agency)
 Formaldehyde.... its safe use in foundries (UK Health and Safety Executive)
 (United States Environmental Protection Agency)
 (Environmental and Occupational Health Assessment Program|Connecticut Department of Public Health)
 (Consumer Product Safety Commission|Consumer Product Safety Commission)
 (Forest Products Laboratory: USDA Forest Service)
 [Dunky, M., "Urea-formaldehyde (UF) adhesive resins for wood," International Journal of Adhesion and Adhesives, 1998. (18:2).]
 (Encyclopædia Britannica)
 (PropEx.com)
 (U.S. Dept. of Labor, Occupational Safety and Health Administration (OSHA))

Polyamides
Synthetic resins
Plastics
Thermosetting plastics